ABP Asmita is an Indian 24-hour regional news channel broadcasting in the Gujarati language. It operates from Ahmedabad, Gujarat. It is owned by ABP Group. The channel was launched on 1 January 2016.

Face of the channel

Leaders 
Brijesh Kumar Singh (previous 2016–2017)
Ronak Patel (2017–present)

Associated anchors 
Ronak Patel
Dhwani Dholakia
Vikas Makwana
Vishal Kalani
Geeta Vaghadiya
Amita Javeri
Zilan Dave
Poonam Bhayani
Juhi Gandhi
Shivangini Maheta
Deepa Sharma
Jigar Thaker

Social media
Facebook (500million followers)
Twitter (169k followers)
YouTube (1.31 million subscribers)

USP
ABP Asmita has covered the Gujarat Assembly Elections 2017 and General Elections 2019. At the regional/state level, ABP Asmita has been covering the elections of municipal corporations, cooperative sectors and other sub-elections.

In 2018, ABP Asmita aired the ‘JAL AE JEEVAN’ (Water is Life) initiative highlighting water-related issues.

Based on Mahatma Gandhi's autobiography, Satya Na Prayogo (My Experiments with Truth), ABP Asmita curated a special interview-based program, ‘Satya Na Prayogo’. An instant success, viewers highly appreciated the show. Based on the program, ABP Asmita began hosting conclaves where dignitaries such as CM Vijay Rupani, Governor Acharya Devvrat-ji, Sanjay Dutt (Actor), Manhar Udas (Singer), RS Sodhi (MD, Amul), Chandubhai Virani (Founder & MD, Balaji Wafers) participated and narrated their life experiences and how the teachings of Mahatma Gandhi helped them in leading a better life.

See also
List of Indian television stations

Shrivardhan Trivedi (Sansani,ABP News)

References

External links
Official Website

Gujarati-language television channels in India
Television stations in Ahmedabad
Television channels and stations established in 2016
ABP Group
2016 establishments in Gujarat
24-hour television news channels in India